The 1903 Oregon Agricultural Aggies football team represented Oregon Agricultural College (now known as Oregon State University) as an independent during the 1903 college football season. In their first and only season under head coach Thomas L. McFadden, the Aggies compiled a 2–4–1 record and were outscored their opponents by a combined total of 32 to 21. The Aggies defeated Washington Agricultural (6–0), and Nevada (15–0), tied with Pacific University (0–0), and lost to Washington (0–5), Multnomah Athletic Club (0–16), Albany College (0–6), and Oregon (0–5). John Gault was the team captain.

Schedule

References

Oregon Agricultural
Oregon State Beavers football seasons
Oregon Agricultural Aggies football